Mana Parbat I (Hindi: माना पर्वत I) is a mountain of the Garhwal Himalaya in Uttarakhand India. It is the 34th highest located entirely within the Uttrakhand. Nanda Devi, is the highest mountain in this category. It is the 490th highest peak in the world. Mana Parbat I located just west of Mana Parbat II  and north west of Kalindi Peak . On the south side lies the Chandra Parbat I  and Pilapani Parbat  on the north west side.

Climbing history

In 1996 A Korean expedition team of ten-member led by Min Kyu-Chung had attempted Mana Parbat I but aborted due to avalanche conditions.

Glaciers and rivers
It is surrounded by glaciers on all the sides: Kalindi Glacier on the southern side, Arwa Glacier on the eastern side, Mana Glacier on the northern side and Raktavarn Glacier on the western side.

Neighboring peaks

Neighboring peaks of Mana Parbat II: 
 Mana Parbat II: 
 Kalindi peak: 
 Pilapani Parbat: 
 Chandra Parbat I:

See also

 List of Himalayan peaks of Uttarakhand

References

Mountains of Uttarakhand
Six-thousanders of the Himalayas
Geography of Chamoli district